Chitas is a Hebrew acronym for Chumash (the five books of Moses), Tehillim (Psalms), and Tanya (a seminal work of Hasidic philosophy by Rabbi Schneur Zalman of Liadi, the Alter Rebbe). These are considered basic Jewish texts according to the Chabad Jewish community, an ultra-orthodox Chasidic group. They have the custom to study these works according to a yearly cycle, which is known colloquially as "doing ChiTaS."

Background 

The divisions of the Chumash and the Psalms are many centuries old, but the Tanya was divided into daily study portions by Rabbi Yosef Yitzchok Schneersohn, the sixth Rebbe of the Chabad-Lubavitch Hasidic community. The term "chitas" is used in this context as a Hebrew acronym (חת"ת) but it is also a Hebrew word for "fear" or "terror" as used in the Hebrew Bible (Genesis 35:5). Some aspects of this daily study practice date back to the beginnings of the Chabad movement in Russia in the mid 1800s. In the beginning of the year 5617 (1856), the Tzemach Tzedek, sent his son, the future Rebbe Maharash, on a mission to Petersburg to handle affairs that would benefit the greater public.

Just before the Rebbe Maharash left for his journey, the Tzemach Tzedek related to him: In the year 5603 (1843), when I was summoned to participate in a rabbinical conference that was to take place in Petersburg, I visited the gravesite of my righteous mother (Rebbetzin Devorah Leah) in Liozna. She told me (in a vision) that because of her self-sacrifice on behalf of the Chassidim and (the continuation of) Chassidus she merited to enter the (heavenly) chamber of the Baal Shem Tov in order to invoke mercy for my success. She asked the Baal Shem Tov to provide her with some segulah (spiritual remedy) for me, that I will be able to stand firm, with G-d’s help, against those who oppose the ways of Chassidus. 

And the Baal Shem Tov answered:

“Your son is after all erudite in the Five Books of the Torah (Chumash), in Psalms (Tehillim) and in Tanya; knowing every single letter by heart. And the verse says, ‘And the terror of G-d was [upon the cities].…’ The Hebrew word for ‘terror’ is “Chitas” (ches, tov, sov), which is an acronym for Chumash, Tehillim, Tanya. And one wh is erudite in their letters eradicates all challenges and concealments.”

Wherever you will be – the Tzemach Tzedek continued his instruction to the Rebbe Maharash – whether in government offices or visiting government ministers, you should recite a parshah of Chumash, a chapter of Tehillim and a chapter of Tanya.

The Rebbe Maharash told his son, my father the Rebbe Rashab: “How do you imagine it worked out? It was a precious recipe! Through the first three parshiyos of Chumash, three chapters of Psalms and three chapters of Tanya, all the proposals of the Maskilim (‘enlightened’ secular Jews) were shattered. And the Children of Israel, together with their holy Torah, emerged victorious, while the chief of the Maskilim fled the country out of shame and fear, for he has caused the government major monetary loss due to the books the government has paid to be printed (and would now not be used).

My father [the Rebbe Rashab] told me: “Great are (advice of) Tzaddikim. During the fifty years from 5617 till now, a chapter of Tanya not only shatters the challenges and concealments, but it also reveals the highest Divine revelations by revealing the realm that is an ‘essential concealment’ of G-d (He’elem Ha’atzmi), into spiritual and physical blessings.”

The formal study practice, as it is observed today, was finalised in 1943 by Rabbi Yosef Yitzchak and his son-in-law, Rabbi Menachem Mendel Schneerson, the seventh Rebbe of Chabad-Lubavitch.

The study guide is divided into three:
 Daily study of Chumash and Rashi (the Five Books of Moses with the commentary of Rabbi Shlomo Yitzchaki) - Each daily allotment of study is a selection of the Weekly Torah portion knowns as the parsha or sidra. The weekly portion is divided into seven, and in the Chitas practice, the seven divisions are used as the daily study allotment. The cycle ends on the Jewish Holiday of Simchat Torah and begins again on the following day known as Isru Chag. Each daily portion is of a regular allotment, with the exception of the first and last days of the cycle, which often occur mid-week, thus requiring the reader to read through several daily allotments on the final and first days of the Chumash cycle.
 Daily recitation of the Book of Psalms - This daily reciation follows the monthly division of the Book of Psalms, as traditionally apportioned. On the last day of any Hebrew month with 29 days instead of 30 days, the reader is required to recite the portions for both the 29th and 30th monthly allotments. The Chabad practice is to recite these passages after the morning prayers and is followed by the recitation of the Mourner's Kaddish (if a quorum of congregants is present). This practice of daily recitation of Psalms was advcated by Rabbi Yosef Yitzchak in 1926
 Daily study of the Chabad Hasidic Book of Tanya - The daily allotment of the Book of Tanya, a seminal work of Chabad Hasidic thought, authored in 1796 by the founder of the movement, Rabbi Shneur Zalman of Liadi, is known as the moreh shiyur, found as an appendix to the standard printing of the Tanya. The moreh shiyur was formalized by Rabbi Menachem Mendel Schneerson in 1943.

Rabbi Menachem Mendel Schneerson often encouraged Jews to follow this cycle, emphasizing that these study portions are applicable to every single Jew. These three texts have been bound together in one volume, which is available from the Kehot Publication Society. The volume also includes other elements of daily use, such as the Siddur.

In Jewish Law 
The topic of the daily recitation of Jewish Biblical passages becomes a matter of debate in Jewish legal discussions concerning the observance of the Fast of the 9th of Av, during which it is prohibited to study Jewish religious texts. The Chabad movement follows the opinion of some religious authorities that anyone accustomed to daily recitation of Psalms or Bible readings may observe their regular study practice after midday. Other religious authorities state that the practitioner must postpone their study until after the Fast of the 9th of Av has ended.

Other daily study texts 
Beginning in 1942, Chabad Chassidim study, in addition, the thought for the day from Rabbi Menachem Mendel Schneerson's timeless calendar, the Hayom Yom. In 1984, Rabbi Menachem Mendel Schneerson also instituted the study of Maimonides' seminal work the Mishneh Torah, to be completed in a cycle lasting just under a year.

See also 
 Shnayim mikra ve-echad targum

References

External links
 English & bilingual study guides: Chabad.org - Chayenu - Chitas for Children
 Chitas study guides in Hebrew: Chabad.org.il - Dvar Malchus

Chabad-Lubavitch texts
Yosef Yitzchak Schneersohn
Chabad-Lubavitch (Hasidic dynasty)